Amphimallon nigripenne is a species of beetle in the Melolonthinae subfamily that is endemic to Turkey.

References

Beetles described in 1902
nigripenne
Endemic fauna of Turkey
Beetles of Asia